Anula Vidyalaya, is a national girls' school in Colombo. It was established in 1941 by Dr. E. W. Adikaram with 38 students and five teachers.

Currently, the school has a student body of over 5,000 girls. The principal and the staff guide the pupils on the Buddhist principles of non-violence and self-discipline.

History 
The founders of Anula Vidyalaya were Dr. E. W. Adikaram, a scholar, educationist, writer, philosopher and a humanist, and the pioneer principal, Mrs. P. B. Fernando. The school was started on 4 January 1941 under the patronage of D. S. Senanayake, then the Minister of Agriculture. The Board of Governors were:
 Dr. P. B. Fernando
 Dr. D. P. Malalasekara
 R. W. Rupasinghe
 D. D. Kodagoda
 D. L. F. Pedris
 T. U. de Silva
 R. Premaratne
 N. Wijasooriya
 S. R. Wijethilake
 Nirmala Ekanayake
 Nanda Rajapaksha
Pioneer Principal - P. B. Fernando - served the school from 1941 till 1956. She donated her total salary towards obtaining a block of land for the school and a scholarship scheme.

Principals 
 P. B. Fernando               1941–1956
 N. Ratnapala                 1956–1970
 C. K. Abeyrathna          1971–1975
 D. S. Meegoda               1976–1985
 Leelananda                1985–1987
 M. K. Welikala                1987–1988
 D. W. Windsor                1989–1991
 N. P.  Jinasena               1991–2000
 Y. P. S. C. Jayathilake     2000–2007
 S. N. Malawiaarachchi    2007–2010
 Kalyani Gunasekara        2010–2013
 N. K. Ekanayake              2013–2014
 P. N. Rajapaksha             2014–2017
 K. A. Jayani Prishangika       2017–2020
 Anoma Dahanayake            2020 - 2021
 Ashini Kodithuwakku  2022 - 10 months 
 Vishaka Rajapaksha 2022 - Present

Houses 
 Sanghamiththa  - 
 Uppalawanna - 
 Dhammadinna - 
 Chulasumana -

References

External links
 Official web site

Educational institutions established in 1941
National schools in Sri Lanka
Schools in Colombo
1941 establishments in Ceylon